Eliason is a surname. Notable people with the surname include:

 Daniel Eliason, British diamond merchant
 Don Eliason (1918–2003), American basketball and football player
 Frank Eliason (born 1972), American corporate executive and author
 Ian Eliason (born 1945), New Zealand rugby union player
 Joyce Eliason (1934-2022), American television writer and producer
 Oscar C. Eliason (1902–1985), Swedish American clergyman
 Roy Eliason (born 1926), Australian rules footballer
 Steve Eliason, American politician

See also 
 8804 Eliason, main-belt asteroid